"The Glass Mountain" (Szklanna Góra) is a Polish fairy tale, translated from the original Polish into German as Der Glasberg. The tale was also compiled by Hermann Kletke and sourced as from Poland.

Andrew Lang included a translation into English in The Yellow Fairy Book. Further publications followed suit, keeping the name.

The name also appears as a mythical location in a different story, Old Rinkrank, one of the original Brothers Grimm fairytales, "Glassberg" or "Glasberg" in the original German.

The tale is classified as Aarne–Thompson type 530, "The Princess on the Glass Hill".

Synopsis

The Polish story begins with: On a glass mountain grew a tree with golden apples.  An apple would let the picker into the golden castle where an enchanted princess lived.  Many knights had tried and failed, so that many bodies lay about the mountain.

A knight in golden armor tried.  One day, he made it halfway up and calmly went down again.  The second day, he tried for the top, and was climbing steadily when an eagle attacked him.  He and his horse fell to their deaths.

A schoolboy killed a lynx and climbed with its claws attached to his feet and hands.  Weary, he rested on the slope.  The eagle thought he was carrion and flew down to eat him.  The boy grabbed it, and it, trying to shake him off, carried him the rest of the way.  He cut off its feet and fell into the apple tree.  The peels of the apples cured his wounds, and he picked more, to let him into the castle.  He married the princess.

The blood of the eagle restored to life everyone who had died trying to climb the mountain.

Origin
John Th. Honti speculated that the fairy tale has its roots in an 11th-century BCE Egyptian story, the "Tale of the Predestined Prince". Other scholars have asserted the tale comes from India.

Analysis
The tale type is said to be one of the most frequent in Polish tradition, with several variants grouped under the banner Szklanna Góra (The Glass Mountain).

Polish ethnographer Oskar Kolberg, in his extensive collection of Polish folktales, compiled several variants: O trzech braciach rycerzach ("About three knightly brothers"), O głupim kominiarzu, O głupim z trzech braci ("About the foolish of the three brothers"), Klechda.

In a Masurian (Poland) tale, Der Ritt in das vierte Stockwerk ("The Ride to the Fourth Floor"), the youngest son of a farmer holds a vigil on his father's grave, receives a magical horse and tries to beat the King's challenge: to find the princess in the fourth floor of the castle.

References

External links
The Glass Mountain

Further reading
 Vandenborre, Katia "La réécriture symboliste de 'La Montagne de verre' ou le destin du conte dans la littérature de la Jeune Pologne", ILCEA, 20 | 2014, 8 December 2014, retrieved 29 October 2020.  

Grimms' Fairy Tales
Polish fairy tales
ATU 500-559